Mesobaetis is a genus of mayflies belonging to the family Baetidae.

The species of this genus are found in Central Asia.

Species:

Mesobaetis allata 
Mesobaetis amplectus 
Mesobaetis crispa 
Mesobaetis latifilamentacea 
Mesobaetis maculata 
Mesobaetis mandalensis 
Mesobaetis ornata 
Mesobaetis sanjianfangensis 
Mesobaetis sibirica

References

Baetidae